Castrillón is a municipality in Asturias, Spain.

Castrillon may also refer to:

People
 Castrillón (surname)

Other uses
 Castrillón (Boal), a civil parish in Asturias, Spain